Dorcadion jakovleviellum is a species of beetle in the family Cerambycidae. It was described by Plavilstshikov in 1951.

References

jakovleviellum
Beetles described in 1951